("Come, Holy Ghost, Creator blest"), WAB 50, is a motet composed by Anton Bruckner in .

History 
Bruckner's manuscript is stored in the Schlägl Abbey, where it was retrieved in 1931. The motet was first published in band IV/1, p. 524 of the Göllerich/Auer biography.

Music 
The motet is a harmonisation of the Gregorian hymn Veni Creator Spiritus for voice(s) and organ.

Discography 
There is a single recording of Bruckner's Veni Creator Spiritus:
 Jonathan Brown, Ealing Abbey Choir, Anton Bruckner: Sacred Motets – CD: Herald HAVPCD 213, 1997 (transcription for male voice choir a cappella)

References

Sources 
 August Göllerich, Anton Bruckner. Ein Lebens- und Schaffens-Bild,  – posthumous edited by Max Auer by G. Bosse, Regensburg, 1932
 Anton Bruckner – Sämtliche Werke, Band XXI: Kleine Kirchenmusikwerke, Musikwissenschaftlicher Verlag der Internationalen Bruckner-Gesellschaft, Hans Bauernfeind and Leopold Nowak (Editor), Vienna, 1984/2001
 Cornelis van Zwol, Anton Bruckner 1824–1896 – Leven en werken, uitg. Thoth, Bussum, Netherlands, 2012.

External links 
 
 Veni Creator Spiritus, WAB 50 Critical discography by Hans Roelofs 

Motets by Anton Bruckner
1884 compositions